Adrian Bawtree (born 1968) is an English composer and organist who currently serves as Director of Music and Organist at Rochester Cathedral.

Education and family
Bawtree was educated at Christ's Hospital before attending the University of Oxford and was an organ scholar at St Bride's Church, Fleet Street, in London. He later studied at Worcester College, Oxford, under David Sanger, and won a silver medal from the Worshipful Company of Musicians for achieving the highest score in the Royal College of Organists exam. He took a postgraduate degree in orchestral conducting at the Royal College of Music.

Bawtree is married to Victoria Rowcroft, Head of Academic Music at St Edmunds School in Canterbury, with whom he has two sons, Matthew and Theo.

Career
Bawtree initially worked as an organist in several churches in England, and is currently the musical director of Cantores Dominicae and the Canterbury Singers and the conductor of the Weald Choir of Crawley. He worked part-time at Christ's Hospital as the chapel organist and as an assistant housemaster before succeeding Bruce Grindlay as Director of Music at the school when Grindlay became headmaster of Sutton Valence School.

In April 2014 Bawtree was appointed Assistant Sub-Organist of Rochester Cathedral, with responsibility for playing services at weekends and major festivals. In September 2015 he was appointed Second Assistant Organist at Canterbury Cathedral. 

In 2022 he was appointed Director of Music and Organist at Rochester Cathedral.

Bawtree occasionally conducts orchestras as well as choirs. He has composed a work inspired by the Battle of Trafalgar and Admiral Nelson called England Expects, as well as a piece called Footsteps along the Road. He has toured the Czech Republic, Hungary and the United States, and has also worked with the BBC Singers.

References

1966 births
Living people
Alumni of the Royal Academy of Music
Alumni of the Royal College of Music
Alumni of Worcester College, Oxford
People educated at Christ's Hospital
Christ's Hospital staff
English composers
English conductors (music)
British male conductors (music)
Fellows of the Royal College of Organists
21st-century British conductors (music)
21st-century British male musicians